Klett is a village in Trondheim municipality in Trøndelag county, Norway.  The village is located in the Leinstrand area of the borough of Heimdal.  The village areas of Heimdal and Tiller lie to the northeast, the Byneset area lies to the west, and the village of Melhus lies to the south. Most of the area surrounding the village is farmland.

To the south of Klett is the junction called Klett Crossing (Klettkrysset)  where the European route E06 and European route E39 highways intersect.
The roundabout was built in 1988. It is the site of the most traffic accidents in all of the old Sør-Trøndelag county. It was also long famous for being the only roundabout in Norway with yellow road-signs. This was a test by the Norwegian road administration, inspired by Sweden.
A renovation of the intersection is scheduled with a startup during summer 2019 and an estimated completion during winter 2020.

References

Geography of Trondheim
Villages in Trøndelag